Sartu District (literal meaning in Mongolian: where the moon rise) is a district of Daqing, Heilongjiang province, China.

Administrative divisions 
Sartu District is divided into 9 subdistricts. 
9 subdistricts
 Sa'ertu, Tieren, Youyi, Fuqiang, Yongjun, Huizhan, Huoju, Dongfeng, Dong'an

Notes and references

See also

External links
  Government site - 

Sartu